Robert William Winn (June 9, 1895 – August 13, 1948) was a U.S. politician from Missouri.

He was born and raised in New London, Missouri. From 1931 to 1937 he served as Clerk of Ralls County, Missouri. In 1937, he became State Treasurer of Missouri, serving in that capacity until January 1941, when he was appointed Commissioner of the Permanent Seat of Government. He served again as state treasurer from 1945 to 1948, but died in office and was succeeded by former State Treasurer Richard R. Nacy.

References

1895 births
1948 deaths
State treasurers of Missouri
Missouri Democrats
County clerks in Missouri
People from Ralls County, Missouri
20th-century American politicians